Pierre Tournier (25 February 1934 – September 2022) was a French football player and manager who played as a midfielder.

Biography
Tournier played for multiple clubs in Division 1, such as SO Montpellier, Olympique de Marseille, and FC Rouen. In total, he completed 415 professional matches, 206 of which were in Division 1.

After his playing career, he coached US Saint-Malo of the Championnat de France Amateur, completed his coaching diploma in 1968.

He then became manager of the FC Sochaux training center, where he trained footballers such as Joël Bats, Bernard Genghini, and Philippe Anziani. In 1982, Jean-Louis Campora recruited him to manage the training facility at AS Monaco. He left the club in 1997 and retired from all football activities.

Tournier died in Beaulieu-sur-Mer in September 2022, at the age of 88.

References

1934 births
2022 deaths
French footballers
Sportspeople from Belfort
Association football midfielders
Ligue 1 players
ASM Belfort players
FC Sochaux-Montbéliard players
Montpellier HSC players
Olympique de Marseille players
ES Troyes AC players
FC Rouen players
French football managers
FC Rouen managers